Camel toe, or cameltoe, is slang for the outline of the labia majora (the outer lips of the vulva) in tightly fitting clothes. Owing to a combination of anatomical factors and the fabric tension in the crotch area, the outer labia and mons pubis may, together, display a shape resembling the forefoot of a camel. Camel toe commonly occurs as a result of wearing clothing with crotch-area vertical tension, such as Spandex activewear or athleisure bottom wear, hotpants or swimwear.

In the 1930s, following the development of Lastex rubberized yarns for swimwear, the resulting exposure of the pubic-area outline resulted in manufacturers adding a "front panel" to women's swimsuits to conceal the camel toe; this persisted through the 1950s.

In the early 21st century the display of camel toe in public or in the media has caused controversy on a number of occasions.

See also
Bralessness
Moose knuckle
Whale tail

References

External links

Clothing controversies
Sexual fetishism
Sexual slang
Vulva
Women and sexuality